Thomas Thorild (Svarteborg, Bohuslän, 18 April 1759 – Greifswald, Swedish Pomerania, 1 October 1808), was a Swedish poet, critic, feminist and philosopher. He was noted for his early support of women's rights. In his 1793 treatise Om kvinnokönets naturliga höghet he advocated gender equality.

He was born in Svarteborg, Sweden and died at Greifswald, which was then Swedish Pomerania, and is now part of the German state of Mecklenburg-Vorpommern. His original name was Thomas Thorén and he studied at Lund University in Sweden and worked or studied at the University of Greifswald in Germany.

Thorild was a supporter of the Sturm und Drang movement and considered an opponent of French-inspired classicism. In 1795 he became a professor and librarian at the University of Greifswald.

He was an important member of the cultural elite in Stockholm during the Gustavian era. He was popular among women because of his beauty and because of his ideas of gender equality; he aroused much attention with his idea, that just as a man was seen as a person first, and as a man (a gender and sexual object) second, a woman, who was seen as a gender and sexual object first and as a person second, should have the right to be seen upon the same way: "Just as foolish as it is to regard a woman only in the capacity of a SHE, it would be to regard a man only in the capacity of a HE".

In Uppsala University's main building from 1887 is Thorild cited above the entrance to the auditorium:
 
Thorildsplan in Stockholm is named after him.

Works
English language
 The sermon of sermons on the impiety of priests and the fall of religion."  1789
 True heavenly religion restored and demonstrated upon eternal principles : With a call to Christians of higher sense.  1790

 References 

 Herman Lindqvist, Historien om Sverige. Gustavs dagar'' (The History of Sweden. The days of Gustav III)
 

1759 births
1808 deaths
People from Munkedal Municipality
Writers from Bohuslän
Swedish Pomerania
People from Swedish Pomerania
Swedish-language poets
Swedish feminists
University of Greifswald alumni
Academic staff of the University of Greifswald
Male feminists
18th-century Swedish poets